ERPNext is a free and open-source integrated Enterprise Resource Planning (ERP) software developed by an Indian software company Frappe Technologies Pvt. Ltd. and is built on MariaDB database system using Frappe, a Python based server-side framework.

ERPNext is a generic ERP software used by manufacturers, distributors and services companies. It includes modules like accounting, CRM, sales, purchasing, website, e-commerce, point of sale, manufacturing, warehouse, project management, inventory, and services. Also, it has domain specific modules like schools, healthcare, agriculture, and non-profit.

ERPNext is an alternative to NetSuite and QAD, and similar in function to Odoo (formerly OpenERP), Tryton and Openbravo. ERPNext was included in the ERP FrontRunners List by Gartner as a Pacesetters.

Core modules 
ERPNext contains these modules: 
 Accounting
 Asset management
 Customer relationship management (CRM)
 Human resource management (HRM)
Payroll
 Project management
 Purchasing
 Sales management
 Warehouse management system
 Website

Industry modules 

 Manufacturing - Manufacturing
 Point of sale (POS) - Retail
 Student Information system - Education
 Hospital Information system - Healthcare
 Agriculture Management - Agriculture
 Nonprofit Organization - Non Profit

Software license
ERPNext is released under the GPL-3.0-only license.  Consequently, ERPNext does not require license fees as opposed to proprietary ERP vendors.  In addition, as long as the terms of the licenses are adhered to, modification of the program is possible.

Architecture 
ERPNext has a Model-View-Controller architecture with metadata modeling tools that add flexibility for users to adapt the software to unique purposes without the need for programming.  Some attributes of the architecture are:

 All objects in the ERP are DocTypes (not to be confused with HTML DocTypes) and the Views are generated directly in the browser.
 Client interacts with the server via JSON data objects on a Representational state transfer (RESTful) supporting server.
 There is ability to plug-in (event driven) code on the client and server side.

The underlying web app framework is called "Frappe Framework"  and is maintained as a separate open source project. Frappe started as a web based metadata framework inspired from Protégé though it has evolved differently.

This architecture allows rapid application development (RAD).

Source code and documentation 

ERPNext source code is hosted on GitHub, using the Git revision control system, and the contributions are also handled using GitHub.

A complete user manual is available at the project website.

Software as a service
ERPNext is available both on user hosting and as a Software as a service (SaaS) from their website. The product also received a funding of INR 10 crore ($1.3Million) from Zerodha and Rainmatter in June 2022.

Investment
In November 2020, Rainmatter incubator invested ₹10 crore ($1.3M) in Frappe Technologies PL, to support development of ERPNext, other open source products, and scaling plans.

Release history

FOSS United 
FOSS United (formerly ERPNext Open Source Software Foundation) is a non-for-profit organization. The goal of the foundation is to provide a platform for the FOSS community of India to come together and build open source applications. Foundation also organises various events like conference and code sprints.

See also

 List of ERP software packages
 iDempiere
List of free and open source software packages

References

External links 
 .

ERP software
Accounting software
2008 software
Free customer relationship management software
Free accounting software
Point of sale companies
Free ERP software
Enterprise resource planning software for Linux
Customer relationship management software companies
Software using the GPL license